218th Division may refer to:

 218th Division (People's Republic of China)
 218th Infantry Division (Wehrmacht)
 218th Rifle Division

Military units and formations disambiguation pages